Finniss is a single-member electoral district for the South Australian House of Assembly. It is named after B. T. Finniss, the first Premier of South Australia. It covers a  regional area which includes the localities of Back Valley, Currency Creek, Encounter Bay, Finniss, Goolwa, Goolwa Beach, Goolwa North, Goolwa South, Hayborough, Hindmarsh Island, Hindmarsh Tiers, Hindmarsh Valley, Lower Inman Valley, McCracken, Middleton, Mosquito Hill, Mount Compass, Mount Observation, Mundoo Island, Nangkita, Port Elliot, Tooperang, and Victor Harbor; as well as parts of Inman Valley and Waitpinga.

Finniss has been a very safe seat for the Liberal Party since its creation at the 1991 electoral redistribution as a replacement for the equally safe Alexandra. Dating to its time as part of Alexandra, the area now in Finniss has been held by Liberals or their predecessor, the Liberal and Country League, without interruption since 1941. For most of that time, it has been a comfortably safe LCL/Liberal seat.

It was contested for the first time at the 1993 election by newly elected Liberal leader Dean Brown, who had returned to parliament after a seven-year absence by winning the 1992 Alexandra state by-election. Brown had little difficulty winning Finniss, and subsequently became Premier after the election. Brown was later toppled as Premier by Liberal rival John Olsen in 1996, and was initially expected to retire, but remained in parliament as a senior member of consecutive Liberal ministries and shadow ministries, and served as deputy leader of the Liberal Party from 2001 to 2005—the first six months of that tenure as Deputy Premier. Brown retired at the 2006 election, and was succeeded by Liberal candidate Michael Pengilly, who held off a concerted attempt by the SA Nationals to take the seat.

Pengilly held the seat easily until retiring at the 2018 election. David Basham retained the seat for the Liberals, despite a spirited challenge from SA-BEST. Indeed, SA-BEST's showing in Finniss was strong enough to make the seat marginal for the first time in its current configuration. However, Finniss remains a comfortably safe Liberal seat in a "traditional" two-party matchup with Labor; Basham only suffered a small swing against Labor.

Most of Finniss is located within the Centre Alliance-held federal Division of Mayo.

Members for Finniss

Election results

Notes

References
 ECSA profile for Finniss: 2018
 ABC profile for Finniss: 2018
 Poll Bludger profile for Finniss: 2018

Electoral districts of South Australia
1993 establishments in Australia